was an Aum Shinrikyo member who was executed for his participation in the 1995 Tokyo subway sarin attack and a number of other crimes. 

He was the man who produced the Sarin gas for the attack after leader Shoko Asahara told him to do so.

Early life
Endo was a native of Sapporo, Hokkaido; he graduated from a veterinary school. He later studied virus and genetic engineering at Kyoto University graduate school.

See also
 Capital punishment in Japan
 List of executions in Japan

References

Aum Shinrikyo
1960 births
2018 deaths
Executed mass murderers
Japanese mass murderers
Japanese people convicted of murder
People convicted of murder by Japan
People executed by Japan by hanging
21st-century executions by Japan
People from Sapporo